The men's 5000 metres at the 2012 African Championships in Athletics was held at the Stade Charles de Gaulle on  1 July.

Medalists

Records

Schedule

Results

Final

References

Results

5000 Men
5000 metres at the African Championships in Athletics